James Wall may refer to:

 James Walter Wall (1820–1872), United States Senator from New Jersey 
 James S. Wall (born 1964), American prelate of the Roman Catholic Church
 James Wall (diplomat), former Canadian ambassador to Angola and Eritrea and current ambassador to the Netherlands
 James Wall (actor) (1917–2010), American actor and stage manager
 James Wall (footballer) (born 1980), English footballer
 James Charles Wall (1860–1943), British ecclesiologist and historian
 James Wall (comedian) (1863–1927), American comedian and minstrel
 James M. Wall (born 1928), American Methodist minister and journalist

See also
Wall (surname)